Nadezhda Noginsk was a Russian women's football from Noginsk, founded in 2001.

It competed for seven years in the top division before it was disbanded following the end of the 2008 season. Nadezhda was third in 2005, 2006 and 2007 and reached the national Cup semifinals twice.

References

External links
  Official webpage

Women's football clubs in Russia
Association football clubs established in 2001
Association football clubs disestablished in 2008
2001 establishments in Russia
2008 disestablishments in Russia
Defunct football clubs in Russia